WHAD (90.7 FM) is a non-commercial radio station licensed to Delafield, Wisconsin and serving the Milwaukee metropolitan area. Part of Wisconsin Public Radio (WPR), it airs WPR's "Ideas Network", consisting of news and talk programming. Like the Milwaukee area's other NPR station, WUWM (licensed to Milwaukee proper), the station airs BBC World Service in the overnight hours. WHAD maintains a local news staff and cut-ins outside the main WPR network, and the station's facilities, located on the seventh floor of 310 W. Wisconsin Avenue in Milwaukee (by coincidence, also hosting the studios of commercial sports radio station WAUK), originate some programming for the network, including Kathleen Dunn's afternoon program until her retirement in the summer of 2017. WHAD has its own 414 studio line for Milwaukee callers to call into locally originated programs. Because of the lack of a sister station providing WPR's News and Classical Network to Milwaukee, WHAD provides the HD2 Classical Network via HD Radio to the market via their HD2 subchannel, which only differs from the News and Classical Network in having a full-classical format overlaying NPR and APM news programming exclusive to WUWM in the market; it became the market's only classical music station over the air in 2007 after WFMR abandoned the format commercially.

The current-day WHAD is of no relation to the WHAD in Milwaukee which broadcast in the 1920s and early 1930s under the ownership of Marquette University before being merged in 1934 into what is now the current-day station WISN (1130). It signed on in 1948 as the second FM station of Wisconsin Educational Radio, forerunner of WPR.

The station's transmitter is located in western Waukesha County just south of Delafield, almost halfway between Milwaukee and Madison. The tower was placed there to provide Ideas Network coverage to some eastern portions of Madison since Ideas Network flagship WHA had to sign off at sunset. While WHA has stayed on the air 24 hours a day since 1987, it must reduce its signal to all-but-unlistenable levels at sunset; WHAD thus still provides nighttime Ideas Network coverage to eastern Madison. WHAD once operated a translator at 107.9 in Madison to provide Ideas Network service to downtown and eastern Madison at night; this translator is now counted as part of the WHA license.

The WHAD signal also reaches into Lake and McHenry County, Illinois in Chicago's northern suburbs, complementing WEPS' coverage of this area. It also competes with Chicago NPR member WBEZ, whose signal reaches into the outer portions of the Milwaukee area.

WHAD's transmitter is located further south and west than most of Milwaukee's other major FM stations in order to remain within 15 miles of Delafield; FCC regulations require a station's transmitter to be no more than 15 miles of its city of license. In contrast, most of Milwaukee's FM stations transmit from various towers across Milwaukee's north side). As a result, WHAD's signal is marginal in the northern part of the market.  Sister stations WRST in Oshkosh (also serving Fond du Lac) and WSHS in Sheboygan provide Ideas Network service to the northern part of the nine-county Milwaukee market area, while the outer northern portions of the area didn't get a clear signal for Ideas Network programming at all until the advent of streaming audio.

See also
 Wisconsin Public Radio

References

External links
Wisconsin Public Radio

Wisconsin Public Radio
HAD
NPR member stations